The Future and Its Enemies: The Growing Conflict Over Creativity, Enterprise, and Progress is a 1998 book by Virginia Postrel where she describes the growing conflict in post-Cold War society between "dynamism" – marked by constant change, creativity and exploration in the pursuit of progress – and "stasism", where progress is controlled by careful and cautious planning. Postrel endorses the former, illustrates the differences between the two, and argues that dynamism should be embraced rather than feared.

Reviews
Richard Ebeling wrote a positive review for the Future of Freedom Foundation in May 1999. He remarked,

Dr. Edward Younkins, a professor at Wheeling Jesuit University, wrote for the journal Free Life praising the book as a "brilliant, bold, and compelling new work". He also referred to it as "a must-read for anyone interested in commerce, technology, public policy, and the search for truth in a dynamic world."

See also
 An Army of Davids
 The Global Trap

References
Citations

Other sources
 The Future and Its Enemies at Virginia Postrel's website, Dynamist.com
 PBS Newshour story
Debate on The Future and Its Enemies between Postrel and David Frum, November 16, 1998, C-SPAN
Booknotes interview with Postrel on The Future and Its Enemies, February 14, 1999, C-SPAN

1998 non-fiction books
Libertarian books